Vladan Aksentijević (born 12 August 1977), better known by his stage name Ajs Nigrutin, is a Serbian rapper and actor.

Known for his nasal baritone vocals, comedic lyrical style and eccentric stage presence, Nigrutin rose to continental prominence as the member of the Belgrade-based recording act Bad Copy. Parallel to his work in Bad Copy, he maintains a successful solo career. He is the recipient of numerous accolades, including three Serbian Oscars of Popularity, two Melko Awards and an Indexi Award. He writes inspiring and motivational texts through intriguing metaphors, humor, and eccentric voices.

Biography 

Vladan Aksentijević was born on 12 August 1977 in Belgrade, Serbia, at the time part of Yugoslavia.

He has released three studio albums as a member of Bad Copy alongside Sky Wikluh and Timbe. Their humorous approach to hip-hop has attracted praise from various musicians, including Dragan Brajović and Don Trialeon. As a trio, they have helped popularize hip hop music in Serbia and former Yugoslavia in the early 21st century.

As a solo performer, he has published four studio albums. In 2004, on behalf of One Records, he provided vocals for the 43zla album Sve same barabe on twelve different tracks. He has also been featured on the Bvana album Fujznem Džigili in 2009, and on the Mononukleozni rodjaci album Priče iz hibernacije in 2011. In 2010, Aksentijević was a featured artist on the Gru track I dalje me žele. The song achieved numerous accolades, including "The Number One Best Rap Song of 2010" by Kurir and the "Number One Best Hip-Hop Songs of the Last Decade" by Blic.

Other than his music career, Nigrutin has worked as a sound man at Radio SKC for 4 years, and has done work for television and film. He has appeared in various shows as a guest, including the Abarth Serbian Challenge, AmiG Show, Veče sa Ivanom Ivanovićem, Big Brother, Ja volim Srbiju, Tvoje lice zvuči poznato and Operacija trijumf. He has also done voice work for Serbian dubs of the Kung Fu Panda franchise, Madagascar: Escape 2 Africa, the Rio movies and Despicable Me.

Nigrutin  now lives in Subotica.

Discography

with Bad Copy 
Orbod Mebej (1996, ITMM)
Sve sami hedovi (2003, One Records)
Najgori do sada (2006, Prohibicija)
Krigle (2013, Mascom Records)

with 43zla 
Sve same barabe (2004, One Records)

with Bvana 
Fujznem Džigili (2009)

Solo 
Nigrutinski rečeno (2002, One Records)
Štrokavi pazuh (2005, One Records)
Kajmak i katran (2008, One Records)
Akupunktura Govneta (2015, One Records)

with Mononukleozni rodjaci 
Priče iz hibernacije (2011)

with Gru 
I dalje me žele (2010)

with Smoke Mardeljano 

 Kad goveda utihnu (2022)

Filmography

Film roles

Television roles

Awards and nominations

Serbian Oscars of Popularity

MTV Platinum Awards

Melko Awards

Indexi Awards

References

External links 
 Ajs Nigrutin on MySpace
 Ajs Nigrutin on LastFM
 Interview for B92

1977 births
Living people
Musicians from Belgrade
Serbian rappers
Serbian baritones
Serbian male film actors
Serbian male television actors
Serbian male voice actors
Serbian multi-instrumentalists
Serbian record producers
Serbian hip hop musicians
Serbian hip hop DJs
Remixers
Indexi Award winners